The Eighteen Arhats (or Luohan) are depicted in Chinese Buddhism as the original followers of Gautama Buddha (arhat) who have followed the Noble Eightfold Path and attained the four stages of enlightenment. They have reached the state of Nirvana and are free of worldly cravings. They are charged to protect the Buddhist faith and to wait on earth for the coming of Maitreya, an enlightened Buddha prophesied to arrive on earth many millennia after Gautama Buddha's death (parinirvana). In China, the eighteen arhats are also a popular subject in Buddhist art, such as the famous Chinese group of glazed pottery luohans from Yixian from about 1000 CE.

In China

Originally, the arhats were composed of only 10 disciples of Gautama Buddha, although the earliest Indian sutras indicate that only 4 of them, Pindola, Kundadhana, Panthaka and Nakula, were instructed to await the coming of Maitreya. Earliest Chinese representations of the arhats can be traced back to as early as the fourth century, and mainly focused on Pindola who was popularized in art by the book Method for Inviting Pindola.

Later this number increased to sixteen to include patriarchs and other spiritual adepts. Teachings about the Arhats eventually made their way to China where they were called Luohan (羅漢, shortened from a-luo-han a Chinese transcription for Arhat), but it wasn't until 654 AD when the Nandimitrāvadāna, Record on the Duration of the Law, spoken by the Great arhat Nadimitra, was translated by Xuanzang into Chinese that the names of these arhats were known. For some reason Kundadhana was dropped from this list.

Somewhere between the late Tang Dynasty and early Five Dynasties and Ten Kingdoms period of China two other Luohans were added to the roster increasing the number to 18. But this depiction of 18 Luohans only gained a foothold in China, whereas other areas like Japan continued to revere only sixteen and their roster differs somewhat. This depiction of having 18 instead of 16 Luohans continues into modern Chinese Buddhist traditions. A cult built around the Luohans as guardians of Buddhist faith gained momentum amongst Chinese Buddhists at the end of the ninth century for they had just been through a period a great persecution under the reign of Emperor Tang Wuzong. In fact the last two additions to this roster, Taming Dragon and Taming Tiger, are thinly veiled swipes against Taoism.

In Chinese art
Because no historical records detailing what the Luohans looked like existed, there were no distinguishing features to tell the Luohans apart in early Chinese depictions. The first portraits of the 16 Luohans were painted by the monk Guanxiu in 891 AD, who at the time was residing in Chengdu. Legend has it that the 16 Luohans knew of Guanxiu's expert calligraphy and painting skills, so they appeared to the monk in a dream to make a request that he paint their portraits.
The paintings depicted them as foreigners having bushy eyebrows, large eyes, hanging cheeks and high noses. They were seated in landscapes, leaning against pine trees and stones. An additional theme in these paintings was that they were portrayed as being unkempt and "eccentric," which emphasizes that they were vagabonds and beggars who have left all worldly desires behind. When Guanxiu was asked how he came up with the depictions, he answered: "It was in a dream that I saw these Gods and Buddhas. After I woke up, I painted what I saw in the dream. So, I guess I can refer to these Luohans as 'Luohans in a dream'." These portraits painted by Guanxiu have become the definitive images for the 18 Luohans in Chinese Buddhist iconography, although in modern depictions they bear more Sinitic features and at the same time have lost their exaggerated foreign features in exchange for more exaggerated expressions.  The paintings were donated by Guanxiu to the Shengyin Temple in Qiantang (present day Hangzhou) where they are preserved with great care and ceremonious respect.  Many prominent artists such as Wu Bin and Ding Guanpeng would later try to faithfully imitate the original paintings.

The Qianlong Emperor was a great admirer of the Luohans and during his visit to see the paintings in 1757, Qianlong not only examined them closely but he also wrote a eulogy to each Luohan image. Copies of these eulogies were presented to the monastery and preserved. In 1764, Qianlong ordered that the paintings held at the Shengyin Monastery be reproduced and engraved on stone tablets for preservation. These were mounted like facets on a marble stupa for public display. The temple was destroyed during the Taiping Rebellion but copies of ink rubbings of the steles were preserved in and outside of China.

Roster
In the Chinese Tradition, the 18 Luohans are generally presented in the order they are said to have appeared to Guan Xiu, not according to their power: Deer Sitting, Happy, Raised Bowl, Raised Pagoda, Meditating, Oversea, Elephant Riding, Laughing Lion, Open Heart, Raised Hand, Thinking, Scratched Ear, Calico Bag, Plantain, Long Eyebrow, Doorman, Taming Dragon and Taming Tiger.

Although the roster varies by region, this is the generally accepted listing.

Gallery

References

Disciples of Gautama Buddha